Thurø is a small Danish island in the south-east of Funen and belongs to the Svendborg municipality. Thurø is part of the South Funen Archipelago, comprising c. 55 islands altogether. The island had 3,555 inhabitants .

Connected to Svendborg proper by a small bridge, Thurø has become a popular place to live due to its quiet streets and proximity to both Svendborg and the new motorway to Odense.

Thurø is also a holiday destination, with two popular sandy beaches, three campsites and a number of houses for rent.

The sea around horseshoe-shaped Thurø is considered fine fishing-water, particularly for trout. There are several small harbours around the island and Thurøbund - the inner part of the horseshoe - is a well-known safe nature-harbour used by the sailing fraternity.

The entire island is served by a direct bus link to Svendborg city centre, from where onward routes cover the Funen region.

History 
According to legend, and as told in Saxo's Gesta Danorum (chronicles of the Danes), as well as in the Scylding Sagas, Helge (brother to Hroar, both known from the Beowolf poems) once came by this island on one of his raiding expeditions. Here, he came to the house of the elf-woman Thora ( Thurø meaning literally Thora's island -or in some legends Thor's Island), whom he raped. When he returned to the island years later, Thora sent out their daughter, Yrsa, to greet him, as revenge. He raped Yrsa, not knowing it was his own daughter, and she then had his son, Rolf Kraka, who would go on and become one of Denmark's greatest and most legendary kings.

Denmark's oldest "pacifier-tree" has been located on Thurø for 85 years. Part of Danish tradition is for children to "sacrifice" their pacifiers (dummies) at a local tree to mark their passage from infancy to childhood.

Notable people 
 Karin Michaëlis (1872-1950) a Danish journalist and author; from 1933 she took in German emigrants at her property in Thurø, including Bertolt Brecht and Marlene Norst; she is buried in Thurø cemetery 
 Laura Brun-Pedersen (1883–1961) a Danish painter of deeply coloured landscapes with human figures and animals; she lived on Thurø for 30 years
 Tom Kristensen (1893 in London – 1974 in Thurø) was a Danish poet, novelist, literary critic and journalist
 Jan Pytlick (born 1967 in Thurø) a Danish handball coach. He was head coach for the Danish women's national handball team 1998-2006 and 2007-2014

References

Sources 
 Den lille Svendborgguide Guide to Svendborg and surroundings

External links 

Islands of Denmark
Geography of Funen
Geography of Svendborg Municipality